The 1976 UCI Track Cycling World Championships were the World Championship for track cycling. They took place in Monteroni di Lecce, Italy in 1976. Due to the 1976 Summer Olympics only seven events were contested, 5 for men (3 for professionals, 2 for amateurs) and 2 for women.

Medal summary

Medal table

See also
 1976 UCI Road World Championships

References

Track cycling
UCI Track Cycling World Championships by year
International cycle races hosted by Italy
1976 in track cycling